Joel Burleson, better known as Ki:Theory (pronounced “Key Theory”) is an American recording artist and producer who specializes in alternative rock with electronic elements.

Biography
In 2009 Ki:Theory released Arms For Legs, a digital work-in-progress LP; songs were self-released as singles and added to the collection as they were completed. CDs Burelson sold came in floppy disc cases, and were stenciled "Ki:Theory" using red spray paint.

In April 2011 Ki:Theory released the EP Messages: Syntax / Error, a collection of previously unreleased songs written as part of film scores, TV commercials, and creative expressions.

On November 30, 2011 Ki:Theory released the single I Wanna Run featuring Maura Davis who was previously part of Denali.

Ki:Theory's first full-length album, KITTY HAWK, was released on October 29, 2013. The album title track is featured in the trailer for the video game FIFA 14, as well as in The Crew.

On February 3, 2014, Ki:Theory's cover of Ben E. King's "Stand by Me" off the KITTY HAWK album was used in Fox's The Following in episode 3 of season 2 as well as the 2014 Super Bowl TV spot, also for The Following. The song has since been used in a trailer for the film Brick Mansions and the CW network TV series Star-Crossed, as well as TV spots for Bates Motel, Dallas, and most recently the Netflix original show Marco Polo. On July 9, 2017, the song was also played at the end of the season 3 mid-season finale of Fear The Walking Dead.

A deluxe edition of the album KITTY HAWK was released in April 2014. It features previously unreleased songs as well as remixes from artists such as Odesza, Fink, and UNKLE.

In January 2015, Ki:Theory released the single The Way It Was. A second single was released in June; If You Don't Care / Fake It alongside a remix by electronic producer GANZ, featuring speed up vocals from the original song.

In November 2016, he contributed to the promotion of the upcoming 2017 live-action Ghost in the Shell film adaptation, starring Scarlett Johansson and based on the manga of the same name by Masamune Shirow, with a cover/remix of Depeche Mode's song "Enjoy the Silence" taken from his album Walkin After Midnight. It is used in the film's first trailer that was released on November 13, 2016.

For his Silence album, on the song "Bringing Me Down", Ki:Theory collaborated with electro-pop singer Ruelle, who provided the vocals.

Remix and sound track work
He has done remixes for Daft Punk/Tron: Legacy, Kings of Leon, Queens of the Stone Age, Ladytron, Odesza, Cypress Hill, Rob Zombie, Sasha, UNKLE, Rodrigo y Gabriela with Hans Zimmer, and Brazilian Girls, amongst others.

Ki:Theory's remix for Daft Punk's "The Son of Flynn" for Tron: Legacy was featured on the official remix album, Tron: Legacy Reconfigured. His remix for Rodrigo Y Gabriela's "Angelica" was included on the Original Motion Picture Soundtrack for Pirates of the Caribbean: On Stranger Tides.

His original music has been featured on various television programs, including The Following, Top Gear, CSI: Crime Scene Investigation, First Ascent for the National Geographic International Channel, National Geographic Wild's 2011 TV series Killer Shots, and MTV's Teen Mom 2.

His songs have appeared in commercials for Converse, Billabong, Gap and Audi, the video game trailer Electronic Arts game FIFA 14, the trailer for the film Abduction starring Taylor Lautner and Sigourney Weaver directed by John Singleton (Boyz n the Hood), as well as in numerous films and videos games including EA's Need for Speed: Shift and WINtA.

Ki:Theory DJed for fashion designer Betsey Johnson during Fall 2010 and Spring 2011 New York Fashion Week.

The song "KITTY HAWK" was featured in the official trailer for EA's FIFA 14 and was also used in the Ubisoft game The Crew. "KITTY HAWK" and "Used to Like You" were also used in Counter-Strike: Global Offensive as a pay-to-use music kit, "MOLOTOV." The song was also later uploaded to the video game osu! by the user "George" and was later ranked by "ByBy13." Ki:Theory composed the song "Frozen" that was featured in EA's The Sims 4.

Tours
Burleson has toured widely in Canada, Japan, Korea, and the US, including a performance at Bonnaroo Music Festival.

Discography

Albums/EPs
 Ki: Theory (2000)
 The Record Sessions EP (2005)
 Brittle Branches EP (October 2006)
 Save Our City (acoustic) EP (May 2008)
 Arms For Legs EP (May 2009)
 Remix EP 1 (September 2010)
 Remix EP 2 (November 2010)
 Messages: Syntax / Error (April 14, 2011)
 Killer Shots (Soundtrack) (August 9, 2011)
 KITTY HAWK (October 29, 2013)
 KITTY HAWK (Remixed and Extended) (April 8, 2014)
 Live Bootleg // Seattle E.M.P. (November 4, 2014)
 Silence (May 5, 2017)
 Relics (January 15, 2021)

Singles
 I Wanna Run (November 29, 2011)
 The Way It Was (January 20, 2015)
 If You Don't Care / Fake It (June 10, 2015)
 Walkin' After Midnight / Enjoy the Silence (Nov 11, 2016)
 Bringing Me Down (feat. Ruelle) (March 29, 2017)

Remixes
 Cedars – “This Century” (2007)
 Army of Me – “Going Through Changes” (2007)
 Butchers Of Sky Valley – “Drop, Cock & Roll” (2007)
 Blacksmoke (feat. Hugh Cornwell) – “Danger Global Warming” (2007)
 UNKLE – “Hold My Hand” (2007)
 Sasha – “Coma” (2007)
 Queens Of The Stone Age – “I’m Designer” (2007)
 Maps – "Lost My Soul" (2007)
 Computer Vs Banjo – “Give Up On Ghosts” (2008)
 Pictures And Sound – “100 Directions” (2008)
 Brazilian Girls – “Good Time” (2008)
 That 1 Guy – “Mustached” (2009)
 Ladytron – “Runaway” (2009)
 Kings of Leon – “Crawl” (2010)
 Kasabian – “Underdog” (2010)
 Mutemath – “BackFire” (2010)
 UNKLE featuring The Black Angels – “Natural Selection” (2010)
 Daft Punk/Tron Legacy – “The Son Of Flynn” (2011), Tron: Legacy Reconfigured
 Daft Punk/Tron Legacy – “Solar Sailer” (2011)
 Rodrigo y Gabriela with Hans Zimmer, Pirates of the Caribbean: On Stranger Tides – “Angelica” (2011)
 Cypress Hill x Rusko - "Shots Go Off" (2012)
 Rob Zombie – “Foxy, Foxy” (2012), Mondo Sex Head EP
 Rob Zombie – “Pussy Liquor” (2012), Mondo Sex Head EP
 Odesza - "Home" (2013)
 Daft Punk - "Harder Better Faster Stronger" (2018)

References

Living people
Year of birth missing (living people)
American alternative rock musicians
American electronic musicians